The 1995 Frankfurt Galaxy season was the third season for the franchise in the World League of American Football (WLAF). The team was led by head coach Ernie Stautner in his first year, and played its home games at Waldstadion in Frankfurt, Germany. They finished the regular season in second place with a record of six wins and four losses. In World Bowl '95, Frankfurt defeated the Amsterdam Admirals 26–22. The victory marked the franchise's first World Bowl championship.

Offseason

World League draft

NFL allocations

Personnel

Staff

Roster

Schedule

Standings

Game summaries

Week 1: vs London Monarchs

Week 2: at Amsterdam Admirals

Week 3: vs Scottish Claymores

Week 4: at Rhein Fire

Week 5: vs Barcelona Dragons

Week 6: at London Monarchs

Week 7: vs Rhein Fire

Week 8: vs Amsterdam Admirals

Week 9: at Scottish Claymores

Week 10: at Barcelona Dragons

Notes

References

Frankfurt Galaxy seasons